The 1993 Individual Ice Speedway World Championship was the 28th edition of the World Championship  The Championship was held on 20 and 21 February 1993 in Saransk in Russia.

Classification

See also 
 1993 Individual Speedway World Championship in classic speedway
 1993 Team Ice Racing World Championship

References 

Ice speedway competitions
World